Anita Ward (born December 20, 1956) (sources differ) is an American singer and musician from Memphis, Tennessee. Beginning her professional music career in the late 1970s, Ward is best known for her 1979 million-selling chart-topper R&B/Disco hit "Ring My Bell" which was #1 on the United States Hot 100, R&B, Dance and United Kingdom charts.

Early life and education
Ward was born in Memphis, Tennessee, United States.  Ward obtained a degree in psychology from Rust College in Holly Springs, Mississippi.

Career
Ward was a schoolteacher before signing a recording contract.

While recording her debut album, record label owner Frederick Knight presented her with a song he had written the previous year for Stacy Lattisaw. Ward did not like the song, but Knight insisted that a dance track was needed to capitalize on the current disco trend, and Ward relented. The song, which was originally a juvenile-targeted tune about teens talking on the telephone, was rewritten with more 'adult' lyrics and the result was the single "Ring My Bell". The single reached number one in the United States, the United Kingdom, and Canada in 1979. Her accompanying debut album, Songs of Love was released that same year. "Ring My Bell" has been remixed and released several times since its original release. After the huge success of "Ring My Bell", "Make Believe Lovers", which was the B-side on most 12" singles for "Ring My Bell", was released, but it failed to chart.

Ward released a second album later in the year; it was common in the 1970s to release albums several months apart. The album, entitled Sweet Surrender, featured the minor hit "Don't Drop My Love", which peaked at No. 87 on the US Billboard Hot 100 chart. The album, similar to Songs of Love, was disco-infused. A third disco album was in the works due to contractual issues between Knight and Ward, but was canceled after three songs had been recorded. These songs were later included on low-budget compilations featuring Anita Ward's first album Songs of Love. These disputes with Knight, a severe car accident Ward later was in, and the fading appeal of disco music halted Ward's career, and she came to be regarded as a one-hit wonder, the fate she originally feared.

Many years later, Ward recorded another album, 1989's Wherever There's Love. The album was recorded in the United States, but was only released internationally as it had no US distributor. The album was a departure from Ward's disco past but still contained mostly fast-tempo 1980s pop songs (including a re-recorded version of "Ring My Bell"), in addition to two ballads. It spawned one single "Be My Baby", which was released in Australia, but it did not chart there. After both the album and single "Be My Baby" failed to chart, Ward took another hiatus from the music industry, focusing on her family, including her daughter born shortly after the release of Wherever There's Love.

On New Year's Eve 2002, Ward performed "Ring My Bell" in New York City's Times Square before a crowd of revelers as part of the city's official celebration. On New Year's Eve 2005 she performed on Beale Street in Memphis, Tennessee, singing "Ring My Bell" and several other disco songs. Ward  appeared in Zagreb, Croatia, on January 4, 2006, the night before the FIS World Cup slalom race on nearby Sljeme, with some other groups and singers from disco era (Nile Rodgers and Chic, Village People, Thelma Houston and Rose Royce). In early 2011, it was announced that Ward was back in the studio and released a new single, "It's My Night".

Discography

Albums

Singles

See also
List of artists who reached number one in the United States
List of artists who reached number one on the U.S. Dance Club Songs chart
List of 1970s one-hit wonders in the United States
List of people from Memphis, Tennessee
List of disco artists (A–E)
List of artists who reached number one on the UK Singles Chart
List of one-hit wonders on the UK Singles Chart

References

External links
 

1956 births
Living people
20th-century African-American women singers
American dance musicians
American disco singers
American rhythm and blues singers
American women pop singers
Epic Records artists
Musicians from Memphis, Tennessee
Rust College alumni
Singers from Tennessee
21st-century African-American people
21st-century African-American women